Jalal Agha (11 July 1945 – 5 March 1995) was an Indian actor and director in Bollywood films. He was the son of the popular comedian actor Agha.  Jalal studied acting at the Film and Television Institute of India, Pune.

Career
He made his debut as a child actor played the role of young Jehangir<ref>{{Cite web|title=Mughal e Azam at 60: One mans quest for perfection created celluloid history|url=https://www.outlookindia.com/newsscroll/mughal-e-azam-at-60-one-mans-quest-for-perfection-created-celluloid-history/1913021|access-date=2021-06-18|website=www.outlookindia.com/}}</ref> in all-time-hit 1960 film Mughal-E-Azam (role was played by Dilip Kumar as an adult). He made his debut in as an adult role in K.A. Abbas's Bambai Raat Ki Bahon Mein (1967), and went on to appear in over 60 Bollywood films from the late 1960s through to the early 1990s, mostly playing supporting roles. His most famous role was in the blockbuster hit Sholay, where he played the Rubab player in the popular song Mehbooba O' Mehbooba. His other roles to mention are Julie (Julie's silent lover), the played the role of singer in Sama Hai Suhana Suhana from the film Ghar Ghar Ki Kahani, Shabana Azmi's brother in Thodi Si Bewafai and Naseeruddin Shah's friend in Dil Akhir Dil Hai. He played a prominent role in Saat Hindustani.

He also made appearances in English-language films such as Bombay Talkie (1970), Gandhi (1982), Kim (1984) and The Deceivers (1988). He wrote and directed a Bollywood film titled Goonj, which released in 1989.

He died of a heart attack on 5 March 1995 at the age of 49. Married to model Valerie Pereira  (divorced July 1982). They had two children Saleem Christopher Agha Bee (of Goa’s Sublime bistro fame) and Vanessa Bee Feuerstein.

Selected filmographyMughal E Azam (1960) as Young Jehangir (child artist)Taqdeer (1967) as SureshMajhli Didi (1967) as Kamal - Hemangini's brotherBambai Raat Ki Bahon Mein (1968) as Johnny / JosephSara Akash (1969) at DiwakarAya Sawan Jhoom Ke (1969) as DeepakSaat Hindustani (1969) as Shakram ShindeBombay Talkie (1970) as Young ManGhar Ghar Ki Kahani (1970) as College studentAisa Bhi Hota Hai (1971) Lakhon Mein Ek (1971) as Jeevan - Makhanlal's sonKathputli  (1971) as MurliHum Tum Aur Woh (1971) as Charan DasDo Boond Pani (1971) as Ganga SinghGomti Ke Kinare (1972) as DhobiZindagi Zindagi (1972) as RatanMan Jaiye (1972) as AshokDo Chor (1972) as BadhruMere Gharib Nawaz (1973) as Yusuf's friendYaadon Ki Baraat (1973) as SalimHoneymoon (1973)Garam Hawa (1974) as ShamshadJab Andhera Hota Hai (1974) as RameshCall Girl (1974)Us Paar (1974) as BhairoShikwa (1974)Jeevan Sangram (1974)Do Nambar Ke Amir (1974)Anjaan Raahen (1974) as Rakesh KapoorAng Se Ang Lagaley (1974) as DrunkerMrig Trishna (1975)Julie (1975) as RichardSholay (1975) as Banjo Player in the song "Mehbooba O' Mehbooba"Badnaam (1975) as SureshKhemro Lodan (1976)Aaj Ka Ye Ghar (1976) as Nutan ChandraTaxi Taxie (1977) as RVShankar Hussain (1977)Saheb Bahadur (1977) as JudgeGharaonda (1977)Adha Din Adhi Raat (1977) as RajuHum Kisise Kum Naheen (1977)Hamara Sansar (1978) as BhimsenGaman (1978) as LalulalGhata (1978) as SureshShyamla (1979)Junoon (1979) as Kader KhanNauker (1979) as JagguDooriyaan (1979) as News Paper VendorDeen Aur Imaan (1979)Dam Maro Dam (1980)Thodisi Bewafai (1980) as Narendra DeshmukhMan Pasand (1980)Karz (1980) as Dr DayalKismet (1980)The Naxalites (1980)Bambai Ka Maharaja (1980)Khuda Kasam (1981) as PanchamBe-Shaque (1981) as MishraWoh Phir Nahin Aaye (1981) Rocky (1981) as himselfHum Paagal Premee (1982)Chorni (1982) as Kishore SinhaVakil Babu (1982) as Anil Kumar ShrivastavDil... Akhir Dil Hai (1982) as Fazal MohammadTeri Maang Sitaron Se Bhar Doon (1982) as Sheriff. Dilip KumarGandhi (1982) as Traveller on Train roof #2Haadsa (1983) as Lorry DriverKatha (1983) as himselfNaukar Biwi Ka (1983) as ChowkidarAakhir (1984)Baazi (1984) as AlbertKim (1984) as Rajah of BunarYeh Ishq Nahin Aasaan (1984) as  Qawaal (uncredited)Tarang (1984) as RussiBandh Honth (1984)Ram Tere Kitne Nam (1985)Anadi Khiladi (1986) Baat Ban Jaye (1986) as Advocate Bharat SinhaItihaas (1987) as Public ProsecutorThe Deceivers (1988) as The NawabBharat Ek Khoj (1988) as Robert Clive in Episode 37 Company Bahadur East India CompanyGoonj (1989) as Napoleon Bonaparte GonsalvesDo Qaidi (1989)Jatt Walaity ( 1992) as Raj/Tiger in Punjabi Movie Pehla Nasha (1993) as Mahesh AhujaJhumka (1995)Rock Dancer (1995)Policewala Gunda (1995)Badmaash (1998) Yaar Meri Zindagi'' (2008) as Shankar (The movie released after his death)

References

External links

  Jalal Agha at Bollywood Hungama

1945 births
1995 deaths
Indian male film actors
Hindi-language film directors
Male actors in Hindi cinema
Film and Television Institute of India alumni
Male actors from Delhi
20th-century Indian male actors
Film directors from Delhi